Larry Croom (born October 29, 1981 in Long Beach, California) is a former American football running back. Croom played for Long Beach Polytechnic High School and then attended Arizona before transferring to UNLV and then joining the NFL and in the German Football League. 

Originally signed as a free agent for the Arizona Cardinals, he saw little playing time before being cut. He played briefly for the Hamburg Sea Devils, and was on the practice squads of the Tennessee Titans, the Detroit Lions, and the San Diego Chargers before playing for the Steelers. 

Croom played in the German Football League for five seasons with the Dresden Monarchs and Berlin Adler.

References

1981 births
Living people
Players of American football from Long Beach, California
American football running backs
UNLV Rebels football players
Arizona Cardinals players
Hamburg Sea Devils players
Tennessee Titans players
Detroit Lions players
San Diego Chargers players
Amsterdam Admirals players
Pittsburgh Steelers players
German Football League players
American expatriate sportspeople in Germany
American expatriate players of American football